Sherwood railway station is located on the Main line in Queensland, Australia. It serves the Brisbane suburb of Sherwood.

History
Sherwood station opened on 5 October 1874 as Oxley West as the interim terminus of the  Main line from Ipswich. It was extended to Oxley Point on 4 February 1875. It was renamed to Sherwood in May 1878.

The line through Indooroopilly was duplicated in June 1886. The station was rebuilt in 1960 as part of the quadruplication of the line.

Services
Sherwood is served by City network services operating from Nambour, Caboolture, Kippa-Ring and Bowen Hills to Springfield Central, Ipswich and Rosewood.

Services by Platform

*Note: One weekday morning service (4:56am from Central) and selected afternoon peak services continue through to Rosewood.  At all other times, a change of train is required at Ipswich.

References

External links

Sherwood station Queensland Rail
Sherwood station Queensland's Railways on the Internet

Railway stations in Brisbane
Railway stations in Australia opened in 1874
Sherwood, Queensland
Main Line railway, Queensland